This is a list of prime ministers of Lebanon (officially titled President of the Council of Ministers) since the creation of the office in 1926.

National Pact
Though it is not specifically stated in the constitution, an unwritten understanding known as the National Pact, agreed in 1943, has resulted in the holder of the post being a Sunni Muslim in every electoral cycle since that time. Nevertheless, several prime ministers in the past have been Christian.

List of officeholders

State of Greater Lebanon, part of the French Mandate (1926–1943)

Lebanese Republic (1943–present)

See also

 Deputy Prime minister of Lebanon
 List of deputy prime ministers of Lebanon

 President of Lebanon
 List of presidents of Lebanon
 Prime Minister of Lebanon
 List of speakers of the Parliament of Lebanon
 Deputy Speaker of the Parliament of Lebanon
 Lists of office-holders

References

Lebanon
Prime Ministers
Lebanon politics-related lists